Clavatula helena is a species of sea snail, a marine gastropod mollusk in the family Clavatulidae.

Description
The size of an adult shell varies between 30 mm and 40 mm. The fusiform shell is moderately long. The ground color of the shell is yellow, superimposed with blotches and streaks of chestnut brown. The space between the sutures is brown in the anterior half. The teleoconch is flattened with a narrow keel posterior to the broad, anal sinus. The anterior half of the teleoconch has between 8 and 12 feeble axial ribs. All over the spire are very fine growth lines. The periphery of the body whorl is well rounded. The aperture is elongately oval. The thick outer lip is notched at the anal sinus. The parietal wall shows a very thick callus. The siphonal canal is very short.

Distribution
This marine species occurs in Jeffrey's Bay - Tsitsikamma, South Africa

References

 Kilburn, R.N. (1985). Turridae (Mollusca: Gastropoda) of southern Africa and Mozambique. Part 2. Subfamily Clavatulinae. Ann. Natal Mus. 26(2), 417–470.

External links
 

Endemic fauna of South Africa
helena
Gastropods described in 1915